Pär-Erik Back (1920–1988) was a Swedish social scientist. He was professor at Umeå University 1965–85 in political science, serving also as dean for the social sciences.

Publications
Herzog und Landschaft (1955), 
En klass i uppbrott (1961), 
Sammanslutningarnas roll i politiken 1870–1970 (1967),
Det svenska partiväsendet (1967; 2nd edition 1978).

References 

1920 births
1988 deaths
Swedish social scientists
Swedish political scientists
Academic staff of Umeå University
20th-century political scientists